Panpoli is a village (Town panchayat) situated near Sengottai Taluk in Tenkasi district, Tamil Nadu, India.

Demographics 
As of the 2011 Census of India, Panpoli had a population of  spread over  households.

Civic Administration 
Panpoli has been entitled with 15 wards as a Town Panchayat.

Economy 
Panpoli's economy is mainly agro-based. The Village acts as a focal point for food grains transported from the adjoining areas of the  Tirunelveli, Thoothukudi, virudhunagar and Madurai district and Kerala mainly. Furthermore, there are many males working overseas and sending back money to their families. The locals are therefore doing better in many ways, with some of them building bigger houses and other buildings.

There have been ongoing public upgrades such as roadworks in the area over the past year.

Agriculture 
Agriculture in Panpoli is the main source of livelihood for most of the people of Panpoli. Rice and Coconut Cultivation have been the major occupation of the local inhabitants. since the land is ideally suited for growing crops like Rice and coconut.

Transportation

Local buses
Bus Routes Tenkasi-thirumalaikovil (Sat, Srt, and 20 Lss) Shencottai-kadayanallur (12c,12d,12f and 12e Lss and Jappan) Kovilpatti-Thirumalaikovil, Shencottai (Mrg, Kr), Tirunelveli-Thirumalaikovil (101 Sfs), Surandai-thirumalaikovil (20m Lss) Sivagiri, Rajapalayam-shencottai (Kayesar), Alangulam-mekkarai (Jayaram)

Buses to Chennai
Chennai ultra-deluxe buses
 184 UD, two buses are regularly operated from Sengottai,
 184 UD, video coach

Trains
Trains available at Sengottai (4 km From Panpoli) include:
 Sengottai – Madurai Passenger
 Sengottai – Chennai Egmore Pothigai Express
 Sengottai - Tirunelveli Passenger
 Sengottai – Chennai Silambu Express via Manamadurai, Thanjavur, Mayiladuthurai (Weekly Twice)
 Sengottai – Tambaram Express
 Kollam – Tambaram Express
 Punalur – Sengottai Passenger

These two depots operate buses from Sengottai to various cities of Tamil Nadu, Puducherry and Kerala. The main cities are Chennai, Tirupur, Coimbatore, Trichy, Madurai, Tiruchendur, Tuticorin, Srivilliputtur and Ramanathapuram in Tamil Nadu and Thiruvananthapuram UD, Pathanamthitta, Kottarakkara, Kottayam, Guruvayur, Punalur, and Quilon (Kollam) in Kerala and Pondicherry in Puducherry.

Educational institutions

Schools
 EMR Govt. Hr Secondary School
 RKV Middle School (Panpoli)
 Rasheeth Primary School
 st.Joseph Matric school
 Panchayat Union primary school
 Royal Primary nursery school
 Joy Nursery and Primary School

Colleges near Panpoli
Sri Parasakthi College for Women (Courtallam)
JP Engineering College (Ayikudi)
Nallamani Yadava College of Art and Science (Kodikuruchi)

References 

Cities and towns in Tenkasi district